Unnameable Books is an independent bookstore located on Vanderbilt Ave, between St. Marks Ave. and Bergen St., in Prospect Heights, Brooklyn, New York.

Overview 
It has been profiled as an example of a small New York bookstore that survives as chains, internet sales, and rising real estate prices drive more established New York independents like Coliseum Books and Murder Ink out of business. It was depicted on the cover of the June 9 and 16, 2008, issue of The New Yorker by the cartoonist Adrian Tomine. Founded as "Adam's Books" before being renamed, it specializes in poetry and has a reputation for an eclectic collection of used books.  It also carries work from small independent presses, such as Ugly Duckling Presse. In 2022, the bookstore moved location to a block away.

References

External links

 
 Adrian Tomine's New Yorker cover, depicting Unnameable Books

Bookstores in Brooklyn
Independent bookstores of the United States
Shops in New York City
Commercial buildings in Brooklyn
Prospect Heights, Brooklyn